The 1985 Atlanta AT&T Challenge of Champions was a tennis tournament in 1985. It was won by Ivan Lendl, 6–2, 6–3 against Jimmy Connors.

Players

Draw

Finals

Group A

Group B

References

1984 in sports in Georgia (U.S. state)
1984 in American tennis
Tennis tournaments in Georgia (U.S. state)